USS Groves (DE-543) was a proposed World War II United States Navy John C. Butler-class destroyer escort that was never completed.

Groves was laid down at the Boston Navy Yard in Boston, Massachusetts. Her construction was cancelled on 5 September 1944 before she could be launched. The incomplete ship was scrapped.

References

Navsource Naval History: Photographic History of the U.S. Navy: Destroyer Escorts, Frigates, Littoral Warfare Vessels

John C. Butler-class destroyer escorts
Proposed ships of the United States Navy